Visa requirements for Guinea-Bissauan citizens are administrative entry restrictions by the authorities of other states placed on citizens of the Guinea-Bissau. As of 2 July 2019, Guinea-Bissauan citizens had visa-free or visa on arrival access to 53 countries and territories, ranking the Guinea-Bissauan passport 91st in terms of travel freedom according to the Henley Passport Index.

Visa requirements map

Visa requirements

Dependent, disputed, or restricted territories
Unrecognized or partially recognized countries

Dependent and autonomous territories

See also

Visa policy of Guinea-Bissau
Guinea-Bissauan passport

References and Notes
References	
	
Notes	

Guinea-Bissau
Foreign relations of Guinea-Bissau